Whatever Gets You Off is the major label debut by Chicago based hard rock band The Last Vegas, released on April 14, 2009, on Nikki Sixx's Eleven Seven Music label. It is the band's fourth full-length album overall.

The album was produced by Mötley Crüe and Sixx:A.M. bassist Nikki Sixx, as well as Sixx:A.M. guitarist DJ Ashba, and songwriter/producer Marti Frederiksen.

After winning a contest hosted by Guitar Center at the Whisky a Go Go in Los Angeles, the band was picked to open for Mötley Crüe, on their US winter Saints Of Los Angeles Tour with Theory of a Deadman and Hinder, as well as $20,000 in cash. Following this, the band was also offered a contract form Mötley Crüe's bassist Nikki Sixx, on his record label - Eleven Seven Music.

6 of the songs on the album: "Love Me Bad", "Whatever Gets You Off", "I'm Bad", "Apologize", "Cherry Red" and "Dirty Things You Do", were all previously featured on the 2008 self-titled album, but were re-recorded especially for this major label release.

The first single from the album was "I'm Bad" which proved to be the band's most successful single to date.

Response
The album gained many positive reviews citing the band as the "next big thing in glam rock", "Awesome rock'n'roll", "Raunchy, rowdy, and ruffed-up glam rock", "Swaggering, stomping, balls-out guitar rock", "Well-swung post-garage pre-punk and/or pre-grunge long-haired dirty-white-boy riff-and-squeal hard rock" and more.
The band was also picked as Spin magazine's "Best New Discovery" at SXSW 2008.
The album also earned a 3.5 out of 5 rating in Allmusic, although being criticized for being another AC/DC worship band.

Track listing

Personnel
Chad Cherry – lead vocals
Adam Arling – guitar
Johnny Wator – guitar
Danny Smash – bass
Nate Arling – drums, percussion

References

2009 albums
The Last Vegas albums
Eleven Seven Label Group albums